Catherine Lucille Hanaway (born November 8, 1963) is an American attorney, former federal prosecutor and Republican candidate for Missouri Governor who served as the United States Attorney for the Eastern District of Missouri from 2005 to 2009, and as the first and only female Speaker of the Missouri House of Representatives from 2002 to 2004.

Early life and education

Catherine was born in Schuyler, Nebraska on November 8, 1963. She spent the rest of her childhood growing up in rural Nebraska and Iowa; she received a marksman first class certificate from the NRA in 7th Grade, and was president of her 4-H club in high school.

Hanaway attended the University of Missouri for three years before earning her Bachelor of Science degree in Journalism from Creighton University, and graduated in the top 10% of her law class from the Catholic University of America. After law school, she worked in the law firm of Peper, Martin Jensen, Maichel & Hetlage, the predecessor firm to Husch Blackwell for four years.

Political career

Catherine began volunteering for Republican campaigns in the early 1990s, and joined Senator Kit Bond's staff in 1993 where she managed his office's operations for Northeast Missouri.

She first ran for elected office in 1998 winning a seat in the Missouri House of Representatives. In 2000, she managed President George W. Bush's campaign operations for Missouri. After her first term in office, she was elected Republican Minority Leader in 2000. Throughout 2001 and 2002, Hanaway recruited candidates and raised large sums of money in a successful attempt to gain the first Republican Majority in the Missouri House in 48 years. Hanaway was elected as the first female Speaker of the Missouri House shortly afterwards.  The Missouri Times described her as "Missouri's Red State Architect" who "fought on the front lines in the war for Missouri's political soul," "transforming Missouri from a national bellwether into a state that has progressively become more crimson."

Missouri Speaker of the House

During her tenure as Speaker, Catherine successfully passed Missouri's first concealed carry law by overriding a veto from Democratic Governor Bob Holden.  She also supported legislation to protect gun manufacturers from lawsuits. In addition to her pro-gun stances, she was also opposed to abortion and passed bills supported by Missouri Right-to-Life. Hanaway also rejected multiple tax increase proposals from Governor Holden as Speaker.  During a 2003 budget dispute in which Holden had requested a tax increase, Hanaway publicly asked him "What part of 'No' don't you understand?"

With the 2002 death of 2-year-old Dominic James in Springfield, the need to reform Missouri's foster care system became broadly evident. Hanaway worked to pass a foster care reform bill that was named after James.

Hanaway ran for Missouri Secretary of State in 2004.  She was endorsed by the National Rifle Association and Missouri Right to Life. In a year that Republicans carried most contested state offices, she lost to Robin Carnahan, the daughter of former Missouri governor Mel Carnahan. She was defeated in her home county of St. Louis by fourteen percentage points.

U.S. Attorney

After the appointment of Raymond W. Gruender to the U.S. Court of Appeals for the Eighth Circuit, Hanaway was appointed United States Attorney for the Eastern District of Missouri, taking office on July 19, 2005.  As the chief federal law enforcement for half of Missouri, Hanaway prosecuted over 4,000 cases.  On taking office, she made a point of visiting every local prosecuting attorney in her district, the first time in over two decades that a U.S. Attorney had done so.

One of Hanaway's focuses as U.S. Attorney was the prosecution of methamphetamine manufacturers and dealers, including illegal immigrants bringing in the drug from outside of Missouri.

She also focused on prosecuting child exploitation cases and government corruption. In a highly publicized case, she successfully sued nursing home chain Cathedral Rock Corp. for Medicaid and Medicare fraud.  She also prosecuted a number of public officials, including a state representative who pleaded guilty to bribing a bank official.

2016 gubernatorial race

On February 11, 2014, Hanaway announced that she was running for Governor of Missouri in the 2016 election. She announced her candidacy after Democratic Missouri Attorney General Chris Koster announced his, and vowed to "build the largest and best grass-roots campaign in Missouri history." She was endorsed by former U.S. Senator Kit Bond, South Carolina Governor Nikki Haley, Kansas Governor Sam Brownback, and Congresswoman Ann Wagner.

Her campaign employed Jeff Roe as a political consultant, Hanaway suspended her campaign for a month after Schweich's suicide.

Hanaway has been very critical of Governor Jay Nixon's response to the unrest in Ferguson.  She feels that he was insufficiently supportive of law enforcement. She also criticized a gubernatorial rival , state Attorney General Chris Koster, for failing to prosecute those who assaulted police officers, looted, and set fires during the unrest.

She has similarly attacked the "lawlessness" at the University of Missouri, and called for the firing of Professor Melissa Click, who was caught on tape calling for "muscle" to be called in to prevent a student journalist from recording certain events at the campus protests in November 2015.  Click was eventually charged with assault and fired.

On November 3, 2015, Hanaway launched a two-week statewide "Restore Conservative Values to Missouri Tour" in an RV nicknamed "Tiger One."  The focus of the tour was supporting law enforcement, fighting abortion, and expanding Second Amendment rights.

Hanaway launched a second bus tour on February 25, 2016, which she called the "Safe and Strong Tour," focusing on her prosecutorial experience and rising crime rates.

In a televised debate on March 17, 2016, Hanaway criticized rival Eric Greitens for accepting a $1 million campaign contribution from venture capitalist Michael Goguen, who has been accused in a lawsuit of sexually abusing a woman who had been the victim of sex trafficking for over a decade.

Hanaway lost the Missouri Republican primary to Eric Greitens, she finished fourth with 19.95% of the popular vote.

Electoral history

State Representative

Secretary of State

Governor

Private life

After leaving office as the U.S. Attorney, she worked for The Ashcroft Group. In 2013 Missouri Lawyers Weekly reported that she had charged the highest hourly rate of any lawyer in Missouri ($793/hour in a Securities and Exchange lawsuit). She is currently a partner with the law firm Husch Blackwell, and lives in St. Louis with her husband Chris, and two children Lucy and Jack.

See also
List of female speakers of legislatures in the United States

References

External links
 Catherine Hanaway for Governor
 Husch Blackwell

|-

|-

1963 births
Columbus School of Law alumni
Creighton University alumni
Living people
Republican Party members of the Missouri House of Representatives
People from Schuyler, Nebraska
Republican National Committee members
Speakers of the Missouri House of Representatives
United States Attorneys for the Eastern District of Missouri
Women state legislators in Missouri
20th-century American women politicians
21st-century American women politicians
20th-century American politicians
21st-century American politicians